The LWF model V is an American two-seat reconnaissance and training biplane built during World War One, and used for a short period afterwards. A variant specially built to test the Liberty L-12 aircraft engine, the model F, was the first aircraft to fly powered by that widely used engine.

Design and development

The model V's most notable feature was its wooden monocoque fuselage, built up of three layers of wooden strips with layers of silk between them. One layer was run fore and aft, while the other two were perpendicular to each other, running in a corkscrew spiral around the fuselage.

The two-bay biplane wings had ailerons on the top wing only,  and the span of the upper wing was greater than that of the lower wing, with the extra length braced with the aid of kingposts and wires above the top wing on early examples, and additional struts angled outwards, affixed to the lower wing on later examples. All but the earliest Thomas-powered examples and the model F also had the wings swept back.

The engine was mounted behind an oval car-type frontal radiator, and enclosed in metal panels that streamlined the forward fuselage, although the later versions dispensed with some of the fairing panels.

Both undercarriage and empennage were conventional for the period, with fore and aft vees connected laterally with the axle and a spreader bar.

Operational history
A modified variant of the V, the F, was the first aircraft to fly with the new Liberty L-12 engine that would find widespread use in the latter part of World War One. The model F in turn led to the "Reconnaissance", an intended production variant of the F, which in turn evolved into the LWF model G, although none of these would see large scale production.

The model V was primarily relegated to training as its performance was not competitive when compared to available French and British military reconnaissance aircraft. As a result, a large number were available when the Czech legions supporting the White Russian (Tsarist) contingent were seeking military aircraft, however by then they were in very poor shape, and only a small number of the 28 that were shipped were even flyable, and even those were found to be of little use, but desperation forced the Czechs to use them for reconnaissance. The sole surviving example was from this contingent.

After the war, LWF attempted to interest the United States Post Office in them as mailplanes, however the sole example doesn't appear to have ever carried the mail, and no orders were forthcoming.

A small number were fitted with floats, with one example being used by the Michigan State Militia until it was overturned in a storm. It does not appear to have been repaired afterwards.

Variants

info from www.aerofiles.com (2008)
V  Thomas engine
V-1  Sturtevant engine
VH-1 Seagull floatplane variant
V-2  Hall-Scott engine
V-3  Sturtevant engine
F modified V-2 variant built to test  Liberty L-12 engine, one built.
F-7 Reconnaissance production variant of model F, one or two built.
Mailplane extensively modified for the United States Postal Service, one built.

Operators
info from www.aerofiles.com (2008)

Czechoslovakian Air Force - bought 28 well worn second-hand examples from the USAAS.

Glavvozduhflot - captured a small number of examples from the retreating Czechoslovakians

United States Army Air Service - purchased 135 examples
United States Post Office - tested one example
Michigan State Militia - operated a VH-1 until damaged in a storm

Survivors and aircraft on display
The sole surviving example of an LWF model V is made up from parts from several surviving examples that had been used by the Czech legions, and is on display at the Národní technické muzeum in Prague, where it is suspended from the ceiling, marked as number 4.

Specifications (model V-1)

References

Notes

Citations

Bibliography

L-W-F aircraft
1910s United States military reconnaissance aircraft
Biplanes
Aircraft first flown in 1917
Single-engined tractor aircraft